Just One Summer is a 2012 Filipino romance-drama film directed by Mac Alejandre, starring Julie Anne San Jose and Elmo Magalona. The movie was produced by GMA Pictures.

Plot
A rich, rebellious boy spends the summer with his father who he has considered long dead and his mistress while waiting for the annulment of his father and his mother's marriage. During his stay with his father during the summer, he meets a poor girl who is his childhood friend and is a scholar of whom her family is depending on; however, she is holding in a secret with regards to the true state of her scholarship. The two meet and comfort each other amidst their problems and they fall for each other as time goes on and as they get to know each other.

Cast
Elmo Magalona as Daniel "Niel" Luna Cuaresma, Jr.
Julie Anne San Jose as Maria Bettina "Beto" Reyes Salazar
Alice Dixson as Irene Luna-Cuaresma - Nyel's mother
Joel Torre as Daniel Cuaresma, Sr. - Nyel's father
Cherry Pie Picache as Juliet 
Buboy Garovillo as Berting Salazar - Beto's father
Gloria Romero as Lola Meding Reyes
Sheena Halili as Epang
Steven Silva as Joseph 
Diva Montelaba as Jillian 
Lexi Fernandez as Shaina 
Jhoana Marie Tan as Samantha
Ken Chan as Francis 
Sef Cadayona as Jason
Benedict Campos
Ana Feleo
Mon Confiado
Betong Sumaya
Maey Bautista
Mega Unciano

Production
In August 2011, it was announced that the JuliElmo tandem will have a movie, after their successful team-up for their first acting project Andres de Saya. The movie was temporarily postponed due their work in Daldalita. The director has been busy with Amaya and TV5's Nandito Ako as well. On March 8, 2012, shooting resumed. The movie was shot in Bulacan and Laguna. As of June/July 2012, the movie is in post-production and the stars are dubbing their voices and recording the songs to be used for the film.

Theme song
The theme song of the film entitled Bakit Ba Ganyan sung by Julie Anne San Jose, was originally interpreted by Dina Bonnevie backed by VST & Co. It was also covered by Tito Sotto, Vic Sotto and Joey de Leon in a Chinese version.

References

External links
 

GMA Pictures films
2012 films
2010s Tagalog-language films
2010s English-language films
Philippine romance films
2012 multilingual films
Philippine multilingual films
Films directed by Mac Alejandre